The 2014 NACAC Cross Country Championships took place on February 22, 2014.  The races were held at the Mount Irvine Bay Golf Course in Mount Irvine, Trinidad and Tobago.  A detailed report of the event was given for the IAAF.

The event was overshadowed by the death of 17-year-old Jamaican junior Cavahn McKenzie who collapsed at the end 6 km junior event, and died shortly after his immediate transfer to Scarborough general hospital.

Complete results were published.

Medallists

Race results

Senior men's race (8 km)

Junior (U20) men's race (6 km)

Senior women's race (6 km)

Junior (U20) women's race (4 km)

Medal table (unofficial)

Note: Totals include both individual and team medals, with medals in the team competition counting as one medal.

Participation
According to an unofficial count, 103 athletes from 10 countries participated.

 (2)
 (4)
 (22)
 (1)
 (17)
 (6)
 (12)
 (20)
 (18)
 (1)

See also
 2014 in athletics (track and field)

References

NACAC Cross Country Championships
NACAC Cross Country Championships
NACAC Cross Country Championships
NACAC Cross Country Championships
Cross country running in Trinidad and Tobago